Verkhnyaya Kulaninka is a rural locality (a selo) in Vodnobuyerachnoye Rural Settlement, Kamyshinsky District, Volgograd Oblast, Russia. The population was 178 as of 2010. There are 6 streets.

Geography 
Verkhnyaya Kulaninka is located on the Volga Upland, 49 km northeast of Kamyshin (the district's administrative centre) by road. Verkhnyaya Dobrinka is the nearest rural locality.

References 

Rural localities in Kamyshinsky District
Volga German people